The Melanitini (evening browns and relatives) are one of the smaller tribes of the Satyrinae in the Nymphalidae (brush-footed butterfly) family. They contain the following genera:

 Aeropetes Billberg, 1820 - sometimes placed in Satyrini
 Aphysoneura Karsch, 1894 - sometimes placed in Elymniini
 Cyllogenes Butler, 1868
 Gnophodes Doubleday, 1849
 Manataria W.F. Kirby, [1902]
 Melanitis Fabricius, 1807
 Paralethe van Son, 1955 - sometimes placed in Satyrini
 Parantirrhoea Wood-Mason, 1881

References

 
Satyrinae
Taxa named by Enzio Reuter
Butterfly tribes